is a 2002 Japanese movie directed by Shinohara Tetsuo starring Esumi Makiko and Etsushi Toyokawa. It is based on a memoir of the same title by the Korean-Japanese author Yu Miri.

Plot summary

Yu Miri (Esumi) is a writer who's just become pregnant by her married lover. When she decides to keep the baby without his help, her ex-boyfriend Yutaka (Toyokawa), now struggling with terminal cancer, decides to help raise him, pledging to "live long enough to hear him say my name."

External links

2002 films
2002 drama films
2000s Japanese-language films
Films directed by Tetsuo Shinohara
2000s Japanese films